The 2013 Emir of Qatar Cup will be the 41st edition of the cup tournament in men's football. It is played by the 1st and 2nd level divisions of the Qatari football league structure.

The draw for the competition is on 1 April 2013.

The cup winner is guaranteed a place in the 2014 AFC Champions League.

Round 1
Four teams from the 2nd Division enter this round, the winners qualify for round two.

Round 2

Round 3

1 Al Kharitiyath were deemed to have played an ineligible player and Al-Gharafa were later awarded a 3:0 victory to proceed to the next round.

Quarter finals

Semi finals

Final 

| colspan="3" style="background:#9cc;"| 18 May 2013

|}

References

Football competitions in Qatar